Surigaonon is an Austronesian language spoken by Surigaonon people. As a regional Philippine language, it is spoken in the province of Surigao del Norte, Dinagat Islands, Surigao del Sur, and some portions of Agusan del Norte, especially the towns near the Mainit Lake, Agusan del Sur and Davao Oriental.

External relationships
Surigaonon refers to the people and the language of the people of Surigao del Sur and del Norte. It compose of ethnic languages of Surigao the mix version of Surigao's ethnic language and Cebuano. It has been heavily influenced by Cebuano due to the influx of many Cebuanos in the region. However, most Cebuano speakers can hardly understand Surigaonon speakers, except for Cebuanos who have been living in the region for years.

Surigaonon is very closely related to the Tausug language of Sulu and the Butuanon language of Butuan.

Varieties

Tandaganon
Tandaganon (also called Tinandag, Naturalis, Tagon-on) is a closely related variety spoken in Tandag and central Surigao del Sur municipalities of San Miguel, Tago, Bayabas, Cagwait, Marihatag, San Agustin, and most of Lianga. It can be classified as a separate language or alternatively as a southern variety of Surigaonon. There are about 100,000 speakers.

Surigaonon (also called Jaun-Jaun, Waya-Waya) itself on the other hand is the northern (Surigao del Norte) variety, with about 400,000 speakers. Surigaonon speakers are distributed throughout Surigao del Norte, northern Surigao del Sur, and northern Agusan del Norte. Surigaonon and Tandaganon speakers can understand each other well, even if they use their own languages in conversation (similar to the mutual intelligibility between the Boholano dialect and the general Cebuano dialect).

Together, Surigaonon and Tandaganon are spoken in Surigao del Norte and most parts of Surigao del Sur, except in the City of Bislig, municipalities of Barobo, Hinatuan, Lingig, and Tagbina. In the non-Surigaonon-speaking areas of Surigao, most of the inhabitants are descended from Cebuano-speaking migrants, and the rest are natives who speak Kamayo, a Mansakan language.

Phonology
According to Dumanig (2015), Surigaonon has a similar phonological inventory as its sister Bisayan languages, Cebuano and Boholano.

Vowels
Below is the vowel system of Surigaonon.

Consonants
Below is a chart of Surigaonon consonants.

Clusters
Surigaonon has 25 consonant clusters (br, bl, bw, by, dr, dy, dw, gr, gw, kr, kl, kw, mw, my, nw, pr, pl, pw, py, sw, sy, tr, tw, ty, hw) and 4 diphthongs (aw, ay, iw, uy), which is similar to Cebuano.

References

Further reading

  
 
 

Visayan languages
Languages of Surigao del Norte
Languages of Surigao del Sur
Languages of Dinagat Islands
Languages of Agusan del Norte
Languages of Agusan del Sur
Languages of Davao Oriental